Ghost Busted or Setannya Kok Beneran? is a 2008 Indonesian horror comedy feature film. The film was directed by Muchyar Syamas, written by Raya Fahreza, and stars Mario Lawalata, Indra Birowo, Ence Bagus, Jill Gladys, Jojon, Chandra Louise, and Tessy. The film was released on July 24, 2008, and is a Millenium Visitama Films and Starvision Plus production.

Plot
Ferdi (Mario Lawalata), Andi (Indra Birowo) and Yatno (Ence Bagus) pretend to be ghostbusters on a TV reality show, The Demon Conquerors, which is about to be cancelled. One day the show’s fan club manager informs the three that the show is a big hit in a little village and that they have been invited there for a meet and greet. When the trio arrive they find out that the villagers want the Demon Conquerors to exorcise the ghost of Sari (Dewi Safira).

References

2008 comedy horror films
2008 films
2008 comedy films
Indonesian comedy horror films